Big Island Lake is a lake in Yosemite National Park, United States.

Big Island Lake was named from the large lake island it contains.

See also
List of lakes in California

References

Lakes of Tuolumne County, California
Lakes of Yosemite National Park